The Apache Ambari project intends to simplify the management of Apache Hadoop clusters using a web UI. It also integrates with other existing applications using Ambari REST APIs.

References

External links

Ambari
Configuration management
Hadoop